Trogium is a genus of granary booklice in the family Trogiidae. There are about eight described species in Trogium.

Species
These eight species belong to the genus Trogium:
 Trogium apterum Broadhead & Richards, 1982
 Trogium braheicola Garcia Aldrete, 1983
 Trogium evansorum Smithers, 1994
 Trogium lapidarium (Badonnel, 1955)
 Trogium picticeps Badonnel, 1976
 Trogium pulsatorium (Linnaeus, 1758) (larger pale booklouse)
 Trogium stellatum (Badonnel, 1969)
 Trogium vanharteni Lienhard, 2008

References

External links

 

Trogiidae
Articles created by Qbugbot